Neil Cooper may refer to:

 Neil Cooper (drummer) (born 1973), drummer who has played for Therapy? and other bands
 Neil Cooper (footballer) (born 1958), Scottish football player and manager
 Neil Cooper (record executive) (1930–2001), founder of record company ROIR (Reachout International Records)
 Neil Cooper (Hollyoaks), a fictional character from British soap opera Hollyoaks

See also 
 Neale Cooper (1963–2018), Scottish football player and manager